Ted Mondésir Lavie Mienandy (born 19 March 1986) is a French professional footballer who plays as a midfielder.

Career
Born in Montpellier, Lavie began his career with FC Brétigny-sur-Orge and was scouted by Bordeaux in summer 2000. He played three matches for Bordeaux and was loaned out to FC Gueugnon in summer for the 2006–07 season. After only three matches for Gueugnon he returned from his loan. In August 2008 he was loaned out to Angers. He played eight matches for Angers in the 2008–09 season. After his return to Bordeaux he was released in July 2009.

In August 2009 he signed for AS Cannes after trialling with the club for a few weeks.

Personal life
Ted's older brother, Aimé, has also played football professionally.

References

External links
 
 
 La fiche de Ted Lavie

1986 births
Living people
French sportspeople of Republic of the Congo descentMontpellier]]
French footballers
Association football midfielders
Ligue 1 players
Ligue 2 players
FC Girondins de Bordeaux players
FC Gueugnon players
Angers SCO players
AS Cannes players
Kawkab Marrakech players
AS Cherbourg Football players
Stade Bordelais (football) players
Aviron Bayonnais players
French expatriate footballers
French expatriate sportspeople in Morocco
Expatriate footballers in Morocco
Black French sportspeople